JSC New Forwarding Company or NFC, is one of the largest independent railway carriers in Russia. It was established in 2003. NFC transports products of oil and mining industries, iron-and-steel works, coal, construction materials, and other goods. CEO of the company is Valeriy Shpakov.

Activity 
NFC has its own fleet of 21,000 freight wagons (including tanks, open wagons, flat-cars), locomotives, all day round control center, and wagon repair service.
NFC transportation geography includes the entire territory of Russia, Lithuania, Latvia, Estonia, Ukraine, Belarus and China.

NFC has 10 operational branch offices in Russian Federation.

References

External links 
 JSC New forwarding company

Railway companies of Russia
Companies based in Moscow